Constantim may refer to the following places in Portugal:

Constantim (Miranda do Douro), a former parish in the municipality of Miranda do Douro
Constantim (Vila Real), a former parish in the municipality of Vila Real

See also
Constantim e Cicouro, a parish in the municipality of Miranda do Douro